The Energomash Corporation (Cyrillic: "Энергомаш") was a Russian power engineering company. Energomash manufactures small cogeneration plants as well as a wide variety of components for the energy industry. In addition to this core activity, Energomash also supplies other engineering services to more than 60 countries.

In addition to producing power technologies, Energomash occupied leading positions in metalware construction, pipeline fittings and nuclear industry equipment.

In 2010 the company was declared bankrupt and in 2015 it was liquidated.

External links 
 Energomash website

References 

Patent# 61702581

Nuclear technology companies of Russia
Electrical engineering companies of Russia
Manufacturing companies based in Moscow
Defunct companies of Russia